Cuatro corazones is a 1939  Argentine musical drama film, and the debut feature film of director Carlos Schlieper. It stars Enrique Santos Discépolo, Gloria Guzmán and Irma Córdoba.

Cast
Enrique Santos Discépolo 		
Gloria Guzmán 		
Irma Córdoba 		
Alberto Vila
Eduardo Sandrini
Herminia Franco
Tania	
Casimiro Ros
Delia Martínez
Salvador Arcella
Osvaldo Chamot
Jorge Alcaraz
Ignacio de Soroa
Adrián Cuneo 			
Juan Casella

References

External links

Cuatro corazones at argentinafilms.com

1939 films
1930s musical drama films
Argentine black-and-white films
Films directed by Carlos Schlieper
1930s Spanish-language films
Tango films
1930s dance films
Argentine musical drama films
1939 drama films
1930s Argentine films